120 (one hundred [and] twenty) is the natural number following 119 and preceding 121. 

In the Germanic languages, the number 120 was also formerly known as "one hundred". This "hundred" of six score is now obsolete, but is described as the long hundred or great hundred in historical contexts.

In mathematics
120 is 
 the factorial of 5, i.e., .
 the fifteenth triangular number, as well as the sum of the first eight triangular numbers, making it also a tetrahedral number. 120 is the smallest number to appear six times in Pascal's triangle (as all triangular and tetragonal numbers appear in it). Because 15 is also triangular, 120 is a doubly triangular number. 120 is divisible by the first 5 triangular numbers and the first 4 tetrahedral numbers. It is the eighth hexagonal number.
 highly composite, superior highly composite, superabundant, and colossally abundant number, with its 16 divisors being more than any number lower than it has, and it is also the smallest number to have exactly that many divisors.
 120 is the first multiply perfect number of order three (a 3-perfect or triperfect number). The sum of its factors (including one and itself) sum to 360; exactly three times 120. Note that perfect numbers are order two (2-perfect) by the same definition.
 120 is the sum of a twin prime pair (59 + 61) and the sum of four consecutive prime numbers (23 + 29 + 31 + 37), four consecutive powers of two (8 + 16 + 32 + 64), and four consecutive powers of three (3 + 9 + 27 + 81).
120 is divisible by the number of primes below it, 30 in this case. However, there is no integer which has 120 as the sum of its proper divisors, making 120 an untouchable number.
 The sum of Euler's totient function  over the first nineteen integers is 120.
 As 120 is a factorial and one less than a square, it, with 11, is one of the few Brown number pairs.  
120 appears in Pierre de Fermat's modified Diophantine problem as the largest known integer of the sequence 1, 3, 8, 120. Fermat wanted to find another positive integer that, when multiplied by any of the other numbers in the sequence, yields a number that is one less than a square. Leonhard Euler also searched for this number. He failed to find an integer, but he did find a fraction that meets the other conditions: .
The internal angles of a regular hexagon (one where all sides and angles are equal) are all 120 degrees.
 There are 120 primes between 3,000 and 4,000.

In science

120 is the atomic number of unbinilium, an element yet to be discovered.

In electrical engineering, each line of the three-phase system are 120 degrees apart from each other.

Three soap films meet along a Plateau border at  angles.

In religion
 The cubits of the height of the Temple building (II Chronicles 3:4)
 The age at which Moses died (Deut. 34:7).
 By extension, in Jewish tradition, to wish someone a long life, one says, "Live until 120"
 The number of Men of the Great Assembly who canonized the Books of the Tanakh and formulated the Jewish prayers
 The number of talents of gold that the Queen of Sheba gave to Solomon in tribute (I Kings 10:10)
 The number of princes King Darius set over his kingdom (Daniel 6:2)
 The summed weight in shekels of the gold spoons offered by each tribal prince of Israel (Num. 7:86).
 In astrology, when two planets in a person's chart are 120 degrees apart from each other, this is called a trine. This is supposed to bring good luck to the person's life.

In sports
 The height (in inches) of a regulation hoop in the National Basketball Association. (In metric units, this is about )

In other fields
120 is also:
 The medical telephone number in China
 In Austria, the telephone number to report a car breakdown on the highway.
 In the US Army, a common diameter for a mortar in mm (M120).
 TT scale, a scale for model trains, is 1:120.
 120 film is a medium format film developed by Kodak.
 120, a 2008 Turkish film
 The Israeli national legislature, the Knesset, has 120 seats.
 China Airlines Flight 120

See also
 List of highways numbered 120
 United Nations Security Council Resolution 120

References

 Wells, D. The Penguin Dictionary of Curious and Interesting Numbers London: Penguin Group. (1987): 135

Integers